Joseph Gaudé (1818–1881) was a French archetier, bowmaker and luthier.

Biography
Served his apprenticeship in Mirecourt (his hometown). His early style of bow making  was very much influenced by the Adam school. He produced excellent bows. He also made many instruments including an occasional guitar. According to Mr. Bernard Millant and Mr. Raffin, Joseph Gaude may have worked for the Etienne Pajeot firm around 1835.  At this point, his output was influenced by Pajeot. He is known to have set up his own shop in Mirecourt in 1854.

Joseph Gaude was a great master and one of the important bow makers of the period. Bows made by Joseph Gaude are rare and made in a very beautiful style that is easy to recognize.

"Not surprisingly, his [Pajeot's] style of work strongly influenced his contemporaries, and his ideas can be glimpsed in the later works of Nicolas Harmand, Jean Adam (bow maker) (Dominique GrandAdam) and his son Jean, Charles Guinot, Joseph Gaudé, Georges Ury, and Nicolas Mauchard, this last almost certainly a pupil or employee for many years." —Philip Kass

Literature
S. Bowden: Pajeot, Bow Makers of the 18th and 19th Centuries (London, 1991).

References 

 
  (see René A. Morel)
 
 
 
 Les Luthiers Parisiens aux XIX et XX siecles Tom 3 "Jean-Baptiste Vuillaume et sa famille - Sylvette Milliot 2006
 
 

1818 births
1881 deaths
Luthiers from Mirecourt
Bow makers
19th-century French people